is a town located in Hino District, Tottori Prefecture, Japan. , the town had an estimated population of 4,144 in 1903 households and a population density of 12 persons per km2. Areas of Nichinan are part of Hiba-Dogo-Taishaku Quasi-National Park.

Geography 
Nichinan is a landlocked town located at the south-western tip of Hino District in the southwestern corner of Tottori Prefecture. The town is mountainous and located on the backbone of the Chūgoku Mountains.

Mountains 
–
–
–
–
–
–
–
–

Lakes

Dams

Rivers 
The Hino River originates in Nichinan. Four of its major tributaries in Nichinan include:

Neighboring municipalities 
Hiroshima Prefecture
Shōbara
Tottori Prefecture
Hino
Nanbu
Okayama Prefecture
Niimi
Shimane Prefecture
Okuizumo
Yasugi

Climate
Nichinan has a Humid climate (Köppen Cfa) characterized by warm, wet summers and cold winters with heavy snowfall.

Demography
Per Japanese census data, the population of Nichinan has been as follows. The town has been suffering from rural depopulation, and the population has been rapidly decreasing since the 1960s.

History
The area of Nichinan was part of ancient Hōki Province. During the Edo Period, it was part of the holdings of the Ikeda clan of Tottori Domain. Following the Meiji restoration. the area was divided into villages within Hino District, Tottori on October 1, 1889, with the establishment of the modern municipalities system. The town of Hokunan (伯南町) was created by the merger of the villages of Hinoue and Yamagami on May 2, 1955. It merged with the villages of Takamiya, Tari, Iwami and Fukue to form the town of Nichinan on April 1, 1959.

Government
Nichinan has a mayor-council form of government with a directly elected mayor and a unicameral town council of ten members. Nichinan, collectively with the other municipalities of Hino District, contributes one member to the Tottori Prefectural Assembly. In terms of national politics, the town is part of Tottori 2nd district of the lower house of the Diet of Japan.

Economy
The economy of Nichinan is based agriculture, forestry, and seasonal tourism to its ski resorts.

Education
Nichinan has one public elementary school and one public junior high school operated by the town government. The town does not have a high school.

Transportation

Railway 
 JR West - Hakubi Line
  -

Highways

Local attractions
Sekka Gorge
Nichinan Historic Village
Nichinan Apple Village
Hanamiyama Ski Resort
Sasaraku-jinja
Gedatsu-ji

Cultural Institutions 

The Nichinan Cultural Center (785 Kasumi, Nichinan, Tottori), located next to the Nichinan Town Hall, houses the town's three main cultural facilities in one building. The Cultural Center is accessible by bus, or a 30-minute walk, from the JR West Hakubi Line Shōyama Station.

Satsuki Hall—a 502-seat performance hall
Nichinan Library
Nichinan Art Museum

References

External links

Nichinan official website 

 
Towns in Tottori Prefecture